Hylodes asper, or the Brazilian torrent frog, is a species of frogs in the family Hylodidae. It is endemic to the Rio de Janeiro and São Paulo states in southeastern Brazil. Living in a high-noise environment, the species uses "semaphoring" to supplement acoustic signalling.

Behaviour
Hylodes asper are diurnal. Males use both visual and acoustic signalling to attract females and to maintain their territories. "Foot-flagging" is the most distinctive visual display, usually performed while calling. In foot-flagging, the raises one hind limb and extends it up and back, exposing the silvery colour of the dorsal surfaces of toes and toe fringes.

Male Hylodes asper have been observed to construct an underwater chamber, apparently for use as a nest for reproduction.

Habitat and conservation
The species' natural habitats are larger forest streams and small forest rivers in primary and old secondary forests. Active by day, it can be found on rocks and low vegetation along the streams.

Hylodes asper is generally common, but local declines have been reported. The most significant threats to this species are the effects of tourism and water pollution, although it generally lives in steep terrain with little development.

References

asper
Endemic fauna of Brazil
Amphibians of Brazil
Frogs of South America
Amphibians described in 2002
Taxonomy articles created by Polbot